Jannis Schliesing (born 5 January 1992) is a German football forward.

Statistics

References

External links
 

1992 births
Living people
Sportspeople from Münster
German footballers
Association football forwards
Rot-Weiß Oberhausen players
VfL Bochum II players
1. FC Bocholt players
3. Liga players
Footballers from North Rhine-Westphalia